The Kingdom of Ghiring was a petty kingdom in the confederation of 24 states known as Chaubisi Rajya. Ghiring was formerly part of the Kingdom of Tanahun, it became independent after their brothers divided the kingdom into three sub-division.

References 

Chaubisi Rajya
Ghiring
Ghiring
History of Nepal
Ghiring